Supersport or super sport may refer to:

Broadcasting
 SuperSport, a brand given to sports television channels operated or originally launched by MultiChoice in South Africa
 SuperSport (South African broadcaster), a pan-African group of sports broadcast television channels mainly broadcast in Sub-Saharan Africa
 C More Sport, a group of sports television channels broadcasting in Nordic countries (except Iceland), originally launched as SuperSport
 Nova Sports, a group of Greek sports television channels formerly known as SuperSport
 Ziggo Sport Totaal, a group of Dutch sports television channels formerly known as SuperSport
 Astro SuperSport, a Malaysian pay-TV channel
 Hub Sports Arena, a Singaporean television channel formerly known as SuperSports Arena
 SuperSport (Albanian TV network), a sports broadcasting package from Albania; airing on DigitAlb
 SUper Sports, a play-by-play sports broadcast produced by Syracuse University's CitrusTV

Vehicles
 Alfa Romeo 6C 1500 Super Sport, a supercharged version of the 6C 1500
 Bugatti Veyron Super Sport, a rear mid-engined supercar
 Super Sport (Chevrolet), an option package offered by Chevrolet on some of its vehicles
 Chevrolet Corvette Super Sport, a show car based on a 1956 Corvette.
 Supersports, an Australian category of sports racing cars

Motorcycling
 Super sport (motorcycle), any sport bike, or more narrowly, a mid-sized sport bike
 Ducati SuperSport, an Italian sport bike
 Tunturi Super Sport, a Finnish motorcycle
 AMA Supersport Championship
 British Supersport Championship
 Supersport World Championship

Other uses
 Schutzstaffel - ᛋᛋ Armanen runes logo referred to as 'Super Sport'
 BSA Supersport Air Rifle
 SuperSport Series, the main domestic first class cricket competition in South Africa
 Supersport United FC, a South African football club based in Pretoria
 SuperSports, a Thai retail store
 Zenith SupersPort, a line of laptop computers sold in the 1980s and 1990s by Zenith Data Systems

See also

 Supercar (disambiguation), including super sports cars
 Hypersport (disambiguation)
 Megasport (disambiguation)
 Ultra sport (disambiguation)
 
 
 Super (disambiguation)
 Sport (disambiguation)